The Letts Executive was the executive of Majority Leader of the Northern Territory Goff Letts, who led the Northern Territory from the implementation of the Northern Territory Legislative Assembly in 1974 until his defeat in his own seat at the 1977 election. It was the first ministry to come from the Legislative Assembly.  He was the only head of government of the Northern Territory not to assume the title of Chief Minister of the Northern Territory, as self-government was not granted until 1978.  His governments did not have anywhere near the range of powers available to Territory governments after the granting of self-government, but nevertheless fulfilled similar functions. Letts' successor as Majority Leader and his one-time deputy, Paul Everingham, became the first Chief Minister in 1978.

Jim Robertson, MLA, while not technically a member of the executive, served as Manager of Government Business throughout this period.

First Executive

The first executive lasted from November 1974 to August 1975, when Deputy Chief Minister Paul Everingham resigned from the executive to focus on his legal practice, and was succeeded as deputy by then-Speaker Bernie Kilgariff.

Second Executive

The second executive served from August to November 1975. It was short-lived, as Bernie Kilgariff, who had replaced Paul Everingham in the executive in August, resigned from the Assembly in November to run for the Australian Senate.

Third Executive

The third executive served from December 1975 to December 1976. Deputy Majority Leader Bernie Kilgariff had resigned in November 1976, requiring a reshuffle of the remaining executive members. In this third executive, Grant Tambling became Deputy Majority Leader and Marshall Perron, a future Chief Minister, was brought into the executive, with several changes also made to the portfolios of other members.

Fourth Executive

The fourth executive lasted from December 1976 to September 1977. It came into existence not because of personnel changes, but as a result of a reshuffle to prepare for the 1977 election. Letts made a short-lived change with this executive, styling its members as "cabinet members" instead of "executive members", which was abandoned when Paul Everingham succeeded Letts as Majority Leader after the election.

This executive was devastated at the 1977 election; five executive members (Goff Letts, Grant Tambling, Liz Andrew, Dave Pollock and Roger Ryan) were among the six Country Liberal Party members to lose their seats. Former Deputy Majority Leader Paul Everingham disbanded his legal practice and returned from the backbenches to replace Letts as Majority Leader, later becoming the first Chief Minister of the Northern Territory, while both surviving members of the last Letts executive, Ian Tuxworth and Marshall Perron, would also later go on to serve as Chief Minister.

References

Northern Territory ministries